The Toplița is a right tributary of the river Vâlsan in Romania. It flows into the Vâlsan in Zărnești.

References

Rivers of Romania
Rivers of Argeș County